Harriet Kawahinekipi Kaumualii (c. 1823–1843) was a Hawaiian noble during the Kingdom of Hawaii.
She was a high chiefess as the granddaughter of Isaac Davis Aikake, the royal advisor to King Kamehameha I.

Early life and family
Harriet was born c. 1823 as Harriet Kaumualii.

Harriet's father was George "Prince" Kaumualii, eldest son of King Kaumualii, the last independent ruler of the island of Kauai. George was a veteran of the War of 1812, but would not inherit the kingdom.

Her mother was Elizabeth Peke (Betty), the youngest daughter of Isaac Davis, from Milford Haven, Wales who was an important military advisor of King Kamehameha I during his conquest of the islands.

She had an older sister named Kamakahai who was adopted by another chiefess and an older brother who died young in 1822.

In 1824, her grandfather Kaumualii, the vassal king of Kauai who had been exiled by Kamehameha II and forced to marry Queen Kaahumanu, died in Honolulu. Harriet's father started a rebellion on Kauai, challenging the rule of King Kamehameha II and Queen Kaahumanu. Hoapili and Kalanimoku, the Prime Minister, were the main commanders for the Kingdom. The rebellion was routed. George and Betty escaped on horseback to the mountains with their infant daughter. Harriet and her mother were soon captured by the troops of Kalanimoku.

They were treated with kindness and the Queen regent nicknamed the child ka wahine kipi ("The Rebel Woman" in the Hawaiian language), in reference to the 1824 battle, a name that stayed with her for the rest of her life. George was captured in a few weeks and they returned his wife and child, but forced him into exile on Oahu. George died shortly after, never to see his homeland ever again.

Marriage

Harriet married John Meek Jr., the son of Captain John Meek, on March 28, 1837, at Honolulu, Oahu. Meek was a hapa-haole and was two years her senior.

Death
She died on September 3, 1843, at the age of about 20, three years prior to her own mother. She is buried in the cemetery of the Maria Lanakila Catholic Church on Maui.

Her husband remarried in 1846 to a woman named Kepookalani and had another son who he named John, who would become the first native Hawaiian photographer. Meek died the same year.

See also
Isaac Davis (Hawaii) family tree

References

1823 births
1843 deaths
Royalty of Kauai and Niihau
Royalty of the Hawaiian Kingdom